George Berry Melton Johnson (6 March 1906 – 28 August 1985) was a New Zealand rower who represented his country at the 1930 British Empire Games.

Early life and family
Born in Christchurch on 6 March 1906, Johnson was the son of Harry Melton Johnson, a cabinetmaker, and Maggie Smart Johnson (née Mauchlin). On 31 March 1934, he married Doreen Annie Greene at Highfield Presbyterian Church, Timaru.

Rowing
A member of the Otago Rowing Club, Johnson was a member of the New Zealand coxless four that competed at the 1930 British Empire Games in Hamilton, Ontario. The crew, which included Vic Olsson, Alex Ross and Charles Saunders, won the bronze medal.

Later life and death
Johnson worked as an accountant. During World War II, he served as a second lieutenant with the 3rd Field Regiment, New Zealand Artillery. His wife died in Dunedin on 20 May 1972. Johnson himself died in Christchurch on 28 August 1985, and his ashes were buried at Andersons Bay Cemetery, Dunedin, with those of his wife.

References

1906 births
1985 deaths
Rowers from Christchurch
New Zealand male rowers
Rowers at the 1930 British Empire Games
Commonwealth Games bronze medallists for New Zealand
Commonwealth Games medallists in rowing
New Zealand military personnel of World War II
Burials at Andersons Bay Cemetery
Medallists at the 1930 British Empire Games